Chen Lu or Lu Chen may refer to:

People named Chen Lu
Chen Lu (painter) ( 15th century), Ming dynasty painter
Lu Chen (scientist) (born 1972), Chinese-born American neuroscientist
Chen Lu (weightlifter) (born 1973), Chinese weightlifter
Chen Lu (figure skater) (born 1976), Chinese figure skater
Chen Lu (badminton) (born 1997), Chinese badminton player
Chen Lu, one of the villains who use the name Radioactive Man

People named Lu Chen
Lu Chen (magician) (born 1976), Taiwanese magician
Lu Chen (actress) (born 1987), Chinese actress

See also
Chenlu, a town in Yintai District, Tongchuan, Shaanxi, China
Lu Zhen (957–1014), Song dynasty official and historian, romanized "Lu Chen" in Wade–Giles